Brandon Terrel Jones (born 19 July 1987) is a Belizean American athlete. He competed for Belize at the 2016 Summer Olympics in the 200 m race; his time of 21.49 seconds in the heats was a seasonal best but did not qualify him for the semifinals.

Jones was born in the U.S. state of Virginia to Belizean father Kent Smith and American mother Carmen Jones-Smith. He attended Hampton University, where he holds the school record in the indoor triple jump. He has competed internationally for Belize since 2012; he competes in sprinting, triple jump, and long jump, and has won medals at the Central American Championships in Athletics. Jones was the flag bearer for Belize at the 2016 Summer Olympics Parade of Nations.

References

External links

1987 births
Living people
American people of Belizean descent
People with acquired Belizean citizenship
Hampton University alumni
Belizean male athletes
Belizean male sprinters
American male sprinters
American male long jumpers
American male triple jumpers
Olympic athletes of Belize
Athletes (track and field) at the 2016 Summer Olympics
Athletes (track and field) at the 2018 Commonwealth Games
Commonwealth Games competitors for Belize
Athletes (track and field) at the 2022 Commonwealth Games